Alexandros Masouras (born 21 March 1998) is a Greek professional footballer who plays as a defensive midfielder for Veria.

Career

PAS Giannina 
In August 2015, Masouras signed his first professional contract with PAS Giannina. He made only two appearances on the Greek Cup against Agrotikos Asteras and AEL Kalloni. He released free from PAS Giannina on summer 2017.

References

External links 
 

1998 births
Living people
Greek footballers
Greece youth international footballers
Super League Greece players
Football League (Greece) players
Gamma Ethniki players
Super League Greece 2 players
PAS Giannina F.C. players
Anagennisi Karditsa F.C. players
Apollon Paralimnio F.C. players
A.E. Karaiskakis F.C. players
Diagoras F.C. players
AO Chania F.C. players
Veria NFC players
Association football midfielders
Footballers from Ioannina